Bambi is the second studio album by American rock band Hippo Campus. It was released on September 28, 2018, through Grand Jury Music and Transgressive Records.

Background 
The first single for Bambi, "Passenger", was released on June 12, 2018. Lead singer Jake Luppen shared that the album was written in the winter of 2017, four months in the middle of the tour of their debut album, Landmark. Luppen said that the track is focused on the challenges of growing alongside the person you love. Stylistically, Luppen said he tried to challenge himself by orchestrating more complex chord progressions. "I started off with a TR-8 groove and the rest followed pretty naturally.” Natalie Harmsen, writing for Atwood describe Luppen's voice as "airy" and "spacey", yet "clear as a bell". Writing for Vents, R. J. Fromenta, described the track as "serene" and had "deliberate" moments similar to the previous album.

On August 22, the title track, "Bambi", was released as the second single ahead of the album. The track also was accompanied with a music video the same day. According to Luppen, "Bambi" was the last song added to the record, and described the track as "elusive". The song focuses on challenges of being a friend to those around you when your mental health is getting in the way. A week prior to the release of the album, Hippo Campus performed the song live for the first time in Paste Studios.

Track listing

Critical reception 

Oliver Kuscher, writing for The Line of Best Fit described the album as serious but important. Kuscher praised the synths in the album as well as the lyricism. Kuscher said in conclusion that "this is music about the important things: finding steady footing in a shaky world, being confused and unsure and not understanding everything, and knowing that that’s alright. It’s about 'searching for a better something'".

References

External links 
 
 Bambi at Genius
 
 Bambi at Transgressive

2018 albums
Albums produced by BJ Burton
Hippo Campus albums
Transgressive Records albums